The SICOFAA Legion of Merit Medal  is awarded annually by the Chief of the Air Staff of the host nation of the Conference of the Chiefs of the Air Staff CONJEFAMER of the member nations of the Cooperation System of the American Air Forces (SICOFAA). Recipients are military members or civilians who have contributed to and promoted the interests of SICOFAA.

Grades
The SICOFAA Legion of Merit is awarded in three grades:

  SICOFAA Legion of Merit Gentleman
  SICOFAA Legion of Merit Officer
  SICOFAA Legion of Merit Grand Cross

Recipients

Enlisted
Abraham Rodriguez

Officers
 Michael E. Ryan
 Salvador E. Batlle
 Antonio Ferraro

Grand Cross
 Ronald Fogleman
 T. Michael Moseley
 Robin Rand
 Mark Welsh
 Tod D. Wolters

See also
 List of aviation awards

References

External links
Information on the history, protocol and description of the award

International orders, decorations, and medals
Aviation awards